Donatella Damiani (born Donatella Casula on 3 June 1958) is an Italian actress and model. She is best known for her role in the 1980 Federico Fellini film The City of Women, in which she played a woman who is sweet, protective, seductive and by her own admission, "full of contradictions." Damiani quickly rose to fame as an Italian sex symbol in the 1980s, featuring in pictorials such as the June 1980 edition of Playboy and the March 1985 edition of Playmen.

Filmography
 How to Seduce Your Teacher (La liceale seduce i professori) - 1979
 The City of Women (La città delle donne) - 1980
 I Don't Understand You Anymore (Non ti conosco più amore) - 1980
 I carabbinieri - 1981
 Honey (Miele di donna) - 1981
 Vigili e vigilesse - 1982
 Grog - 1982
 Hanna D. - The Girl from Vondel Park (Hanna D. - La ragazza del Vondel Park) - 1984
 Lola's Secret (Il peccato di Lola) - 1985

References
 
 Publicity on IMDb

1958 births
Living people
Italian film actresses
Actresses from Naples
20th-century Italian actresses
Italian female models